Al-Ahmul is a sub-district located in Far Al Udayn District, Ibb Governorate, Yemen. Al-Ahmul had a population of 8928 according to the 2004 census.

References 

Sub-districts in Far Al Udayn District